Mara Keggi (born October 7, 1962) is an American rower of Latvian descent. She competed in the women's coxless pair event at the 1988 Summer Olympics.

She is the daughter of Latvian orthopedic surgeon Kristaps Keggi.

References

External links
 

1962 births
Living people
American female rowers
Olympic rowers of the United States
Rowers at the 1988 Summer Olympics
Place of birth missing (living people)
American people of Latvian descent
21st-century American women